The 2023 ICC Men's Cricket World Cup Qualifier is an upcoming edition of the Cricket World Cup Qualifier, a cricket tournament, scheduled to take place in June and July 2023 in Zimbabwe. It will serve as part of the 2023 Cricket World Cup qualification process, and will decide the final two participants for the 2023 World Cup.

It will feature ten teams in total, the bottom five teams from the 2020–23 World Cup Super League (excluding World Cup hosts India), the top three teams from the 2019–23 World Cup League 2, and the top two teams from the 2023 World Cup Qualifier Play-off. Two sides will qualify from this tournament to complete the ten-team World Cup field.

Originally, it was intended that the top ranked team in the CWC League 2 would be promoted to the next 2020–2023 ICC Cricket World Cup Super League at the expense of its 13th ranked team – if the League 2 team finished as the higher of the two in the 2023 Cricket World Cup Qualifier. The team ranked lower would then have played in the next edition of League 2. However, in November 2021 the ICC announced that there would not be a second edition of the Super League.

All matches in the qualifier tournament will have One Day International (ODI) status, even if a team does not have ODI status. In July 2020, Zimbabwe Cricket announced their intentions to host the qualifier. Zimbabwe had hosted the previous qualification tournament, in March 2018. In December 2020, Zimbabwe were confirmed as the hosts of the tournament.

Teams and qualification

References 

World Cup Qualifier
ICC World Cup Qualifier
Qualifier